Timothy Matthew Lajcik (born June 21, 1965) is a retired American mixed martial artist, stuntman, actor and writer. Lajcik competed in the heavyweight division of the Ultimate Fighting Championship and the Pancrase. He lost his last fight at WFA 2 - Level 2 against Kimo Leopoldo on July 5, 2002. Lajcik holds a B.A. in Sociology with an emphasis on social work.

Championships and Accomplishments
International Fighting Championship
IFC Warrior Challenge 2 Tournament Winner
IFC Warrior Challenge 7 Tournament Semifinalst

Mixed martial arts record

|-
| Loss
| align=center| 7–6–1
| Kimo Leopoldo
| TKO (broken toe)
| WFA 2: Level 2
| 
| align=center| 1
| align=center| 1:55
| Nevada, United States
| 
|-
| Loss
| align=center| 7–5–1
| Marcelo Tigre
| TKO (punches)
| Pancrase - 2001 Anniversary Show
| 
| align=center| 1
| align=center| 1:34
| Kanagawa, Japan
| 
|-
| Win
| align=center| 7–4–1
| Osami Shibuya
| Decision (unanimous)
| Pancrase - 2001 Neo-Blood Tournament Second Round
| 
| align=center| 3
| align=center| 5:00
| Tokyo, Japan
| 
|-
| Win
| align=center| 6–4–1
| Kengo Watanabe
| KO (punches)
| Pancrase - Proof 2
| 
| align=center| 1
| align=center| 3:23
| Osaka, Japan
| 
|-
| Loss
| align=center| 5–4–1
| Jeff Monson
| Decision
| UFC 27
| 
| align=center| 2
| align=center| 5:00
| Louisiana, United States
| 
|-
| Loss
| align=center| 5–3–1
| Gan McGee
| TKO (submission to strikes)
| IFC WC 7: Warriors Challenge 7
| 
| align=center| 1
| align=center| 4:38
| California, United States
| IFC WC 7 Tournament Semifinal.
|-
| Win
| align=center| 5–2–1
| Joe Campanella
| TKO
| IFC WC 7: Warriors Challenge 7
| 
| align=center| 1
| align=center| 0:18
| California, United States
| IFC WC 7 Tournament Quarterfinal.
|-
| Loss
| align=center| 4–2–1
| Borislav Jeliazkov
| Submission (rear-naked choke)
| RINGS: King of Kings 1999 Block B
| 
| align=center| 1
| align=center| 2:23
| Osaka, Japan
| 
|-
|  Draw
| align=center| 4–1–1
| Ron Waterman
| Draw
| UFC 22
| 
| align=center| 3
| align=center| 5:00
| Louisiana, United States
| 
|-
| Loss
| align=center| 4–1
| Tsuyoshi Kohsaka
| TKO (corner stoppage)
| UFC 21
| 
| align=center| 2
| align=center| 5:00
| Iowa, United States
| 
|-
| Win
| align=center| 4–0
| Mark Tullius
| TKO (submission to strikes)
| NG 9: Neutral Grounds 9
| 
| align=center| 1
| align=center| 6:58
| 
| 
|-
| Win
| align=center| 3–0
| Eugene Jackson
| Submission (rear naked choke)
| IFC WC 2: Warriors Challenge 2
| 
| align=center| 1
| align=center| 9:49
| California, United States
| Won the IFC WC 2 Tournament.
|-
| Win
| align=center| 2–0
| David Ross
| TKO
| IFC WC 2: Warriors Challenge 2
| 
| align=center| 1
| align=center| 5:36
| California, United States
| IFC WC 2 Tournament Semifinal.
|-
| Win
| align=center| 1–0
| Paul Devich
| TKO
| IFC WC 2: Warriors Challenge 2
| 
| align=center| 1
| align=center| 1:20
| California, United States
| IFC WC 2 Tournament Quarterfinal.

References

External links
www.timlajcik.com

Facebook
Twitter

1965 births
Living people
American male mixed martial artists
Mixed martial artists from California
Heavyweight mixed martial artists
UC Davis Aggies football players
American people of Czech descent
American people of Bohemian descent
Ultimate Fighting Championship male fighters